Marie Claire Curtin (born 7 August 1985) is a former professional footballer who played for Republic of Ireland women's national football team. Curtin played for several clubs in the Women's National League, including Cork Women's F.C., Galway, Limerick and most recently Treaty United. She has also represented UCD in Europe. Curtin has also played at a semi-professional level for Long Island Fury in the Women's Premier Soccer League and for Fortuna Ålesund in the Norwegian First Division. In 2013 Curtin and her father, Sean, co-founded a dairy foods company, Temple Dairy Ltd. Curtin retired from football in January 2021.

Early years and education
Curtin was raised in County Limerick, near Kilmallock. The Curtin family have run a dairy farm between Banogue and Athlacca since the 1940s and Marie's parents, Sean and Eileen, took over the farm in 1975. She is one of seven children, with three brothers and three sisters. She began playing association football on the farm with her siblings and their friends from an early age. Curtin attended Ard Scoil Mhuire in Bruff. Between 2004 and 2008 Curtin attended Hofstra University on a four-year full soccer scholarship where she gained a BA in social sciences.

Association football

Lifford Ladies
Throughout her career Curtin played regularly for Ennis-based Lifford Ladies. In 2001 Curtin was named  FAI Under-19 Women's International Player of the Year while playing for Lifford. She also made her senior debut for the Republic of Ireland while a Lifford player. Marie's sister, Anne Curtin, also played for Lifford Ladies and was a university international. The Curtin sisters helped Lifford Ladies reach the 2003 FAI Women's Cup final which they lost 2–0 to UCD. Marie Curtin subsequently guested for UCD in their 2003–04 UEFA Women's Cup campaign.

Hofstra Pride
Between 2004 and 2008 Curtin attended Hofstra University on a soccer scholarship. Her teammates at Hofstra Pride included fellow Republic of Ireland women's internationals, Diane Caldwell and Edel Malone.

Semi-professional
Curtin has played at a semi-professional level. Between 2005 and 2008, while attending Hofstra University, Curtin also played for Long Island Fury in the Women's Premier Soccer League. On May 20 2005, Curtin scored the first three goals in the team's history, scoring a first half hat-trick as Long Island defeated Northampton Laurels 5–0 as they made their WPSL debut. Curtin had a second spell as a semi-professional when she played for Fortuna Ålesund during the 2012 Norwegian First Division season.

Women's National League
Before the establishment of Women's National League, Curtin was playing junior football with Kilmallock United. In 2010 Curtin helped them reach the FAI Women's Junior Cup final which they lost 1–0 to Bohemians. The inaugural 2011–12 Women's National League season saw Curtin playing for Cork Women's F.C. The 2014–15 season saw Curtin sign for Galway W.F.C. By 2017 Curtin was playing for Aisling-Annacotty in the Limerick Women's & Schoolgirls' Soccer League. In 2018 she made a return to the WNL with Limerick. 2020 saw Curtin play for newly formed Treaty United of the WNL after Limerick were liquidated. She retired from professional football on the 11th of January 2021.

Republic of Ireland
Curtin has represented the Republic of Ireland at under–16, under–18 and under–19 levels. Between 2000 and 2012 Curtin won 45 caps while representing the senior team. She made her debut for the senior team, aged just 16, in a behind closed doors friendly against Arsenal Ladies. She won her first full senior cap against Greece. Curtin represented the Republic of Ireland in qualifying campaigns for the 2005, 2009  and  2013 UEFA Women's Euros and the 2007  and 2011 FIFA Women's World Cups. Curtin also represented Ireland at the 2007 Summer Universiade.

Ladies' Gaelic football

On 26 September 2010 Curtin scored 2-5 and was named player of the match as she helped Limerick defeat  in the 2010 All-Ireland Junior Ladies' Football Championship final.

Business woman
In 2013 Curtin and her father, Sean, co-founded a dairy foods company, Temple Dairy Ltd. The company's main product is a healthy chocolate milk drink. Curtin is the company's managing director. In April 2017 Curtin promoted her product on an edition of Dragons' Den.

Honours

Association football
Individual
FAI Under-19 Women's International Player of the Year
Winner: 2001
Long Island Fury
Women's Premier Soccer League
Winners: 2006
Kilmallock United
FAI Women's Junior Cup
Runners Up: 2010

Gaelic football

All-Ireland Junior Ladies' Football Championship
Winner: 2010

References

1985 births
Living people
Republic of Ireland women's association footballers
Republic of Ireland women's international footballers
Women's association football defenders
Fortuna Ålesund players
Expatriate women's footballers in Norway
Expatriate women's soccer players in the United States
Hofstra Pride women's soccer players
Republic of Ireland expatriate association footballers
Irish expatriate sportspeople in the United States
Irish expatriate sportspeople in Norway
Association footballers from County Limerick
Women's National League (Ireland) players
Cork City W.F.C. players
Galway W.F.C. players
UCD Women's Soccer Club players
Limerick W.F.C. players
Limerick ladies' Gaelic footballers
Ladies' Gaelic footballers who switched code
Irish women in business
Treaty United W.F.C. players
Republic of Ireland women's youth international footballers